Amblyseius crassicaudalis is a species of mite in the family Phytoseiidae.

References

crassicaudalis
Articles created by Qbugbot
Animals described in 1998
Taxa named by Wolfgang Karg